Goodenia macroplectra is a species of flowering plant in the family Goodeniaceae and is endemic to inland Western Australia. It an erect herb with toothed, lance-shaped leaves at the base of the plant, and racemes of dark yellow flowers with a long spur.

Description
The leaves on the stem are similar but smaller.

Taxonomy and naming
This species was first formally described in 1882 by Ferdinand von Mueller who gave it the name Velleia macroplectra in Fragmenta Phytographiae Australiae. In 1990 Roger Charles Carolin changed the name to Goodenia macroplectra in the journal Telopea and selected the specimens collected by John Forrest near the Gascoyne River as the lectotype. The specific epithet (macroplectra) means "large spur".

Distribution and habitat
This goodenia grows in inland areas of Western Australia between the Gascoyne River and Leonora.

Conservation status
Goodenia macroplectra is classified as "not threatened" by the Western Australian Government Department of Parks and Wildlife.

References

 macroplectra
Eudicots of Western Australia
Plants described in 1882
Taxa named by Ferdinand von Mueller